Deep Gems is a collection of singles, B-sides, and rarities by American electronic music duo Glass Candy, released in October 2008 by the Italians Do It Better label.

Track listing

Notes
 "Poison or Remedy" is an alternative version of the track "Beatific" from the B/E/A/T/B/O/X album.
 "Stars & Houses" is an alternative version of the track "Digital Versicolor" from the B/E/A/T/B/O/X album.
 "Geto Boys" samples "Mind Playing Tricks on Me" originally performed by the Geto Boys.
 "Ms. Broadway" is a cover of the 1977 Belle Epoque song.

Personnel
Credits adapted from the liner notes of Deep Gems.

 Glass Candy – arrangement 
 Johnny Jewel – production
 Eyvind Kang – viola, violin 
 Nat Walker – tenor saxophone

References

2008 compilation albums
B-side compilation albums
Glass Candy albums